Ea quae pro bono pacis (For the promotion of peace) was a bull issued by Pope Julius II on 24 January 1506 by which the Treaty of Tordesillas, which divided the world unknown to Europeans between Portugal and Spain, but lacked papal approval as it countered previous bulls by Pope Alexander VI, was approved and ratified by the Catholic Church. The request of confirmation came from the king of Portugal; therefore, the bull is addressed to the chief Portuguese bishops. The treaty was confirmed to "foster peace" between the two Catholic monarchies and solve colonial disputes, hence the title of the bull.

Sources

See also
Treaty of Tordesillas

16th-century papal bulls
1506 in Christianity